The Civic Initiative – Progressive Movement of Kosovar Roma (LPRK; , KRAP) is a political party in Kosovo representing the Romani community. 

The party ran in the 2021 legislative elections, winning 1,208 votes, and initially failing to achieve representation in Assembly. However, the party made a complaint to the Election Complaints and Appeals Panel over the irregularity of votes received by the Romani Initiative (RI), who received a large part of their votes from Serb-majority municipalities. This complaint was partially accepted by the Election Complaints and Appeals Panel, which decided to annul 837 votes coming from the municipalities of Leposavić, Novo Brdo, Ranilug, Parteš and Klokot (later confirmed by the Supreme Court of Kosovo). This meant that RI lost a seat (from its previous two), and allowed LPRK to gain representation in the Assembly with one seat.

The party currently has a confidence and supply agreement with the LVV-led government, and the party voted for the LVV-backed candidate Vjosa Osmani in the 2021 Kosovan presidential election.

Electoral performance

References

Political parties in Kosovo
Political parties of minorities in Kosovo
Romani political parties